Matthew Alan Gunter (born December 20, 1957) is the eighth and current Bishop of the Episcopal Diocese of Fond du Lac, Wisconsin, in The Episcopal Church. He is also bishop provisional of the adjoining Diocese of Eau Claire. Prior to becoming bishop, he served as Rector of St. Barnabas Episcopal Church in Glen Ellyn, Illinois, and as Assistant Rector of St. David Church, Glenview, Illinois.

Early life and education
Gunter was raised on a farm in northern Indiana and worked in the family-run sawmill. He received his bachelor's degree in history from Indiana University. He then taught and worked in education. He married Leslie in 1981. After college, he attended Gordon-Conwell Seminary for a time then moved to California, where he taught high school. While there he was a member of a Lutheran church and volunteered as the youth leader until he joined an Episcopal church and was confirmed in 1990. In 1993, he attended Virginia Theological Seminary, receiving his degree in 1996.

Priesthood
Gunter was ordained deacon on June 8, 1996, by Bishop David Mercer Schofield and a priest on December 21, 1996, by Bishop Frank Griswold. In addition to his pastoral work at the parish level, Gunter served as Spiritual Advisor, Chicago Episcopal Cursillo; Member of Diocese of Chicago Commission on Global Ministry; Dean, Aurora Deanery; Deputy to three General Conventions; Chaplain of the 75th General Convention; Member of Diocesan Windsor Report Task Force; Led four-member official delegation from Diocese of Chicago to Diocese of Renk, Sudan; Board of Directors – Ekklesia Project (2003-2006); Chair of Diocesan Annual Campaign; Spiritual Director on several Cursillo weekends; Spiritual Director on two Happening weekends and hand-to-hand volunteer for San Joaquin County AIDS Foundation.

Election as Bishop
Gunter was elected bishop of the Diocese of Fond du Lac on October 19, 2013. Following a successful consent process, he was consecrated bishop on April 26, 2014, by Presiding Bishop Katharine Jefferts Schori in Appleton, Wisconsin.

See also
 List of Episcopal bishops of the United States
 Historical list of the Episcopal bishops of the United States

References

External links
The Diocese of Fond du Lac

21st-century Anglican bishops in the United States
Indiana University alumni
Religious leaders from Wisconsin
Virginia Theological Seminary alumni
People from Glen Ellyn, Illinois
People from Fond du Lac, Wisconsin
1957 births
Living people
Episcopal bishops of Fond du Lac